Terrorist attacks were carried out on two No. 18 buses on Jaffa Road in Jerusalem, in 1996. Hamas suicide bombers killed 45 people in the attacks, which were masterminded by Mohammed Deif, using explosives prepared by Adnan Awul. These two bombings, within a few days of each other, occurred during a Hamas offensive launched after the killing of Yahya Ayyash, which also included the French Hill neighborhood attack, a suicide bombing in Ashkelon, and a terrorist attack near Dizengoff Center in Tel Aviv.

First bombing
On the morning of February 25, 1996, a suicide bomber blew himself up on a No.18 bus traveling down Jaffa Road near the Jerusalem Central Bus Station. 17 civilians and 9 Israeli soldiers were killed and 48, mostly civilians, injured.

In 2014 journalist Mike Kelly published The Bus on Jaffa Road; A Story of Middle East Terrorism and the Search for Justice.  Kirkus Reviews praised it as, "a spiral of horror and reckoning".

According to Kelly, Yassir Arafat was aware of these planned bombings.

Attack planner

Hamas operative Hassan Salameh was captured by Israel in Hebron in May, 1996.  Israel, which has only once imposed a death penalty, sentenced Salameh to 46 consecutive life sentences for directing 3 mass-casualty attacks. Salameh, a devout Muslim, has continued to maintain that he acted in a righteous manner in bombing civilian buses, saying, "I believe what I did is a legitimate right my religion and all of the world gave me..." in 1997, and in an interview almost 2 decades later. According to Mike Kelly, Salameh was trained in Iran.

Second bombing
On the morning of March 3, 1996, a suicide bomber boarded another No. 18 bus, detonating an explosive belt that killed 16 civilians and three Israeli soldiers and wounded 7.

Legal action
The families of United States victims Matthew Eisenfeld and Sarah Duker sued Iran for backing the attack, and won a US$327 million judgment in 2000. The Clinton Administration then blocked the families' efforts to seize certain Iranian assets in the United States. As of 2006 collection efforts continue through legal process. The families, together with the family of another United States citizen killed in the same attack, now seek as much as US$900 million from Iran. In 2006 an Italian court domesticated the US court ruling, and temporarily froze Iranian assets. The plaintiffs have stated that they intend to pursue Iran through other European Union courts.

Gallery

See also
List of Hamas suicide attacks
Palestinian political violence

References

External links
Fatal Terrorist Attacks in Israel Since the DOP (Sept 1993)

Explosions in 1996
Islamic terrorist incidents in 1996
February 1996 events in Asia
March 1996 events in Asia
Hamas suicide bombings of buses
Terrorist incidents in Jerusalem
Mass murder in 1996
People convicted on terrorism charges
Terrorist incidents in Jerusalem in the 1990s